Chris Hurter is a South African rugby league footballer who represented South Africa in the 2000 World Cup.

References

Living people
South African rugby league players
South Africa national rugby league team players
Rugby league wingers
Place of birth missing (living people)
Year of birth missing (living people)